Paul J. Dahm  (born 30 December 1951 in Bascharage) is a Luxembourgian composer. He is best known for his arrangement of Mozart's three sonatas. Along with the American jazz pianist George Letellier, Dahm has also arranged the tunes of Frank Sinatra and the big band era and turned them into philharmonic ensembles with Opus 78.

References

External links
Official site

1951 births
Living people
Luxembourgian composers
People from Käerjeng